Vans is both a given name and surname. Notable people with the name include:

 Patrick Vans, Lord Barnbarroch (1529–1597), Scottish judge
 Sir Gammer Vans, character in an English fairy tale of the same name
 Vans Kennedy (1784–1846), Scottish major-general

See also 
 Van (disambiguation)
 Vans (disambiguation)

See also
Patrick Alexander Vans Agnew (1822–1848), British civil servant